Local Media Group, Inc., formerly Dow Jones Local Media Group and Ottaway Newspapers Inc., owned newspapers, websites and niche publications in California, Maine, Massachusetts, New Hampshire, New York, Oregon and Pennsylvania. It was headquartered in Campbell Hall, New York, and its flagship was the Times Herald-Record, serving Middletown and other suburbs of New York City. 

The Ottaway organization was founded in by James H. Ottaway Sr., owner of the Endicott Daily Bulletin of Endicott, NY, in 1936. It had grown to nine newspapers in the northeastern United States by 1970, when it was acquired by Dow Jones & Company, publisher of The Wall Street Journal, and later a subsidiary of Rupert Murdoch's News Corporation. Following the 2013 split of News Corporation into 21st Century Fox and News Corp, News Corp sold the Dow Jones Local Media Group to Newcastle Investment Corp., an affiliate of Fortress Investment Group, which placed the holdings in the GateHouse Media portfolio of its New Media Investment Group, renamed Gannett following that company's 2019 acquisition by New Media Investment Group.

History

Ottaway newspapers
James H. Ottaway Sr. founded the company in November 1936, when he purchased the Bulletin, a semi-weekly paper in Endicott, New York, that he converted to a daily within a year. Ottaway added the Oneonta Star in 1944, followed two years later by the Pocono Record.

The company was a seller more often than a buyer in the 2000s (decade), however, and several observers—including the New York Post, The Boston Globe and Ottaway's own Cape Cod Times—speculated that News Corporation intended to sell all or part of the company in the near future.

Dow Jones Local Media Group
Under Dow Jones' ownership, Ottaway sold several newspapers in recent years, however, most recently in December 2006, when the company dealt nearly half its daily newspapers to Community Newspaper Holdings Inc. (CNHI) for $287.9 million (including real estate).

Until December 2006, the following dailies and weeklies were also part of the Ottaway chain. Other than the California and Connecticut newspapers, they are all now part of CNHI.
 Santa Cruz Sentinel daily of Santa Cruz, California
 The News-Times daily of Danbury, Connecticut
 The Spectrum weekly of Milford, Connecticut
 Traverse City Record-Eagle daily of Traverse City, Michigan
 The Grand Traverse Herald weekly of Traverse City, Michigan
 Cooperstown Crier weekly of Cooperstown, New York
 Daily Star of Oneonta, New York
 Press-Republican of Plattsburgh, New York
 Daily Item of Sunbury, Pennsylvania
 The Danville News weekdays only, of Danville, Pennsylvania

These four daily newspapers were sold by Ottaway to CNHI for $182 million in 2002:
 The Herald of Sharon, Pennsylvania
 The Independent of Ashland, Kentucky
 The Free Press of Mankato, Minnesota
 The Joplin Globe of Joplin, Missouri

Also, Ottaway sold the three daily newspapers of Essex County Newspapers Inc. to The Eagle-Tribune of North Andover, Massachusetts, in 2002, for $70 million. The Eagle-Tribune, along with the Essex papers listed below, was later purchased by CNHI.
 Daily News of Newburyport of Newburyport, Massachusetts
 Gloucester Daily Times of Gloucester, Massachusetts
 Salem Evening News of Salem, Massachusetts

Sale to Newcastle
On September 4, 2013, News Corp announced that it would sell the Dow Jones Local Media Group to Newcastle Investment Corp.—an affiliate of Fortress Investment Group, for $87 million. The newspapers will be operated by GateHouse Media, a newspaper group owned by Fortress. News Corp. CEO and former Wall Street Journal editor Robert James Thomson indicated that the newspapers were "not strategically consistent with the emerging portfolio" of the company.  GateHouse in turn filed prepackaged Chapter 11 bankruptcy on September 27, 2013, to restructure its debt obligations in order to accommodate the acquisition. Newcastle combined Local Media Group with the post-bankruptcy GateHouse Media later in 2013 to form New Media Investment Group.

Holdings

Holdings by frequency of publication
Dow Jones Local Media Group published eight daily and 15 weekly newspapers in seven U.S. states. Its circulation was given in 2005 as 282,000 daily, 316,000 Sunday and 119,000 daily unique visitors on newspaper Internet sites.

Daily newspapers are:
 Ashland Daily Tidings of Ashland, Oregon (sold)
 Cape Cod Times of Barnstable, Massachusetts
 Mail Tribune of Medford, Oregon (sold)
 Pocono Record of Stroudsburg, Pennsylvania
 The Portsmouth Herald of Portsmouth, New Hampshire
 The Record of Stockton, California
 The Standard-Times of New Bedford, Massachusetts
 Times Herald-Record of Middletown, New York

Weekly and twice-weekly newspapers include the following:
 The Barnstable Patriot of Barnstable, Massachusetts
 The Inquirer & Mirror of Nantucket, Massachusetts
 Hathaway Publishing, published alongside The Standard-Times:
 The Advocate of Fairhaven, Massachusetts
 The Chronicle of Dartmouth, Massachusetts
 The Fall River Spirit of Fall River, Massachusetts
 Middleboro Gazette of Middleborough, Massachusetts
 The Spectator of Somerset, Massachusetts
 The New England Business Bulletin of Southeastern Massachusetts
 Seacoast Media Group, published alongside The Portsmouth Herald:
 The Exeter News-Letter of Exeter, New Hampshire (twice-weekly)
 The Hampton Union of Hampton, New Hampshire (twice-weekly)
 The Rockingham News of Plaistow, New Hampshire
 York County Coast Star of Kennebunk, Maine
 The York Weekly of York, Maine
 Hudson Valley Media Group, published alongside the Times Herald-Record:
 The Gazette of Port Jervis, New York

Holdings by location
Holdings as of September 2013, immediately after News Corporation sold the Dow Jones Local Media Group portfolio, with its name then shortened to Local Media Group, was merged into the new owner's GateHouse Media group.

California
 The Desert Dispatch, Barstow, CA
 The Record, Stockton, CA
 The Daily Press, Victorville, CA

Massachusetts
 The Advocate
 Barnstable Patriot
 Cape Cod Times
 Cape Cod View
 The Chronicle
 The Fall River Spirit
 The Inquirer and Mirror, Nantucket, MA
 Middleboro Gazette
 Nantucket Today
 New England Business Bulletin
 The Spectator
 The Standard-Times, New Bedford, MA

New Hampshire
 The Exeter News-Letter
 Foster's Daily Democrat
 The Hampton Union
 The Portsmouth Herald
 York County Coast Star
 The York Weekly

New York
 Limelight Deals, Middletown, NY
 Marketing Blacksmith, Middletown, NY
 Orange Magazine
 Times Herald-Record, Middletown, NY

Oregon
 Ashland Daily Tidings (sold)
 Medford Mail Tribune (sold)
 The Nickel, Medford, OR (sold)

Pennsylvania
 Pocono Record, Stroudsburg, PA

Footnotes

American companies established in 1936
Publishing companies established in 1936
Mass media companies established in 1936
Companies based in Orange County, New York
Gannett
Ottaway Community Newspapers
Mass media in California
Mass media in Massachusetts
Mass media in New Hampshire
Mass media in New York (state)
Mass media in Oregon
Mass media in Pennsylvania
Newspaper companies of the United States
2013 mergers and acquisitions
Former News Corporation subsidiaries